Tengiomyces is a genus of fungi in the Helminthosphaeriaceae family of the Ascomycota. The relationship of this taxon to other taxa within the Sordariomycetes class is unknown (incertae sedis), and it has not yet been placed with certainty into any order. This is a monotypic genus, containing the single species Tengiomyces indicus.

References

External links
Index Fungorum

Sordariomycetes
Monotypic Sordariomycetes genera